The Trisha Goddard Show (also stylized as Trisha) is an American syndicated tabloid talk show hosted by Trisha Goddard. It was a spin-off of Maury and was based on Goddard's UK show. The show premiered on September 17, 2012. It also aired in the United Kingdom on Channel 5 between October 2012 and July 2014.

On January 25, 2013, Barry Wallach — president of NBCUniversal Television Distribution — announced that the series had been renewed for a second season.

On April 1, 2014, it was announced that The Trisha Goddard Show had been canceled.

Ratings
Out of the five new talk shows to premiere during the 2012-13 television season, Trisha ranked fifth behind Katie, Steve Harvey, The Jeff Probst Show, and The Ricki Lake Show for the same television season. During the week of November 5, 2012, Trisha averaged 706,000 viewers, which is deemed acceptable due to clearances on affiliates of lower networks, such as The CW and MyNetworkTV.

References

External links
 
 Official Facebook page

2010s American television talk shows
2012 American television series debuts
2014 American television series endings
American television spin-offs
American television series based on British television series
English-language television shows
First-run syndicated television programs in the United States
Television series by Universal Television